The Panzergrenadier Division Feldherrnhalle, was a semi-armoured formation of the German Army during World War II.

History 
The Panzergrenadier Division "Feldherrnhalle" was created on 20 June 1943 in the south of France by the renaming and reorganization of the 60th Infantry Division which had been destroyed at Stalingrad. Most of the recruits had previously been members of the SA or had undergone a training course in one of the twelve "Sturm Banners" scattered throughout the Reich. The name "Feldherrnhalle" was used by the original infantry regiment 271 or its 3rd Battalion. 

During the division's formation, it was stationed in the Nimes - Montpellier area. At the beginning of September 1943, the division took part in the disarmament of the 8th Italian Army as part of Operation Achse. At the end of October 1943, the division moved to northern France to the Arras-Doullens area and at the beginning of December 1943 to the Eastern Front. 

Here it took up defensive positions as part of the 3rd Panzer Army in the area of Vitebsk. In February it was sent to the North to fight in the Battle of Narva. In May 1944, it returned to Army Group Centre and fought against the Soviet Mogilev Offensive in June.
The division was destroyed during the Soviet Minsk Offensive in July 1944, as part of Operation Bagration.

Panzer-Division Feldherrnhalle (1) 
The Division was recreated on 1 September 1944 in Warthelager and then in Hungary in the Debreczen area.
On 27 November 1944, the division was renamed Panzer-Division Feldherrnhalle and again destroyed during the Battle of Budapest in February 1945.

The division was recreated again as Panzer-Division Feldherrnhalle 1.

The remnants of the division surrendered to the Soviets in May 1945 at Deutsch-Brod.

Commanders

Panzergrenadier Division Feldherrnhalle

Panzer Division Feldherrnhalle (1)

Composition Panzergrenadier-Division Feldherrnhalle, June 1943 
 Division Stab
 Füsilier-Regiment Feldherrnhalle
 Grenadier-Regiment Feldherrnhalle
 Panzer-Abteilung Feldherrnhalle
 Panzer-Aufklärungs-Abteilung Feldherrnhalle
 Artillerie Regiment Feldherrnhalle
 FlaK-Bataillon Feldherrnhalle
 Pionier-Bataillon Feldherrnhalle
 Nachrichten-Kompanie Feldherrnhalle

Sources

 

Military units and formations established in 1943
Feldherrnhalle
1943 establishments in Germany
Military units and formations disestablished in 1945